The 2015 UK & Ireland Greyhound Racing Year was the 90th year of greyhound racing in the United Kingdom and Ireland.

Summary
Trainer Kevin Hutton secured a last race success with El Pedro that helped him lift his first Trainers Championship. The English Greyhound Derby attracted 273 entries and was won by Rio Quattro while the Irish equivalent was won by Ballymac Matt. 

Barry Faulkner the Chief Executive of the Greyhound Board of Great Britain who explained that the projected budget from the bookmakers for the fund for the year would be well below £7 million. This meant that it was over 40% lower than 2008 and the seventh consecutive annual decrease was blamed on reduced betting shop greyhound turnover. Online streaming of BAGS (Bookmakers’ Afternoon Greyhound Service) racing started via SIS and Mediastream was announced by BAGS chairman Dominic Ford as a possible new revenue source that could benefit the industry.

Two trainers George Andreas and Tony Collett switched back to Sittingbourne from Wimbledon and Patsy Cusack handed over his licence to head man Mark Fenwick. Former Racing Manager Jim Layton and trainer Henry Chalkley both died. At Wimbledon the Merton Council passed the AFC Wimbledon plans for a new football stadium meaning that help was now required from London mayor Boris Johnson. The GRA lease ended in July, which brought the end of greyhound racing in London ever nearer. 

The year ended with Towcester's team manager Andy Lisemore steering the track to the BAGS/SIS Championship after winning the final at Perry Barr. Swift Hoffman was named Greyhound of the Year and Mark Wallis picked up the champion trainer accolade and in the process equalled the record of seven set by John 'Ginger' McGee Sr.

Roll of honour

Principal UK finals

Principal Irish finals

References 

Greyhound racing in the United Kingdom
Greyhound racing in the Republic of Ireland
2015 in British sport
2015 in Irish sport